KM-233 is a synthetic cannabinoid drug which is a structural analog of Δ8-tetrahydrocannabinol (THC), the less active but more stable isomer of the active component of Cannabis.  KM-233 differs from Δ8-THC by the pentyl side chain being replaced by a 1,1-dimethylbenzyl group. It has high binding affinity in vitro for both the CB1 and CB2 receptors, with a CB2 affinity of 0.91 nM and 13-fold selectivity over the CB1 receptor. In animal studies, it has been found to be a potential treatment for glioma, a form of brain tumor. Many related analogues are known where the 1,1-dimethylbenzyl group is substituted or replaced by other groups, with a fairly well established structure-activity relationship.

See also 
 AM-411
 AMG-36

References 

Phenols
Cannabinoids
Benzochromenes